Kolga Nature Reserve is a nature reserve situated in south-western Estonia, in Pärnu County.

Kolga Nature Reserve protects a number of sand dunes, overgrown with forests. The sand dunes were formed from sediments from the Baltic Ice Lake and Ancylus Lake, i.e. after the last ice age. Species in the nature reserve includes white-tailed eagle, eagle owl and pygmy owl. The flora includes several species of orchid.

References

Nature reserves in Estonia
Geography of Pärnu County
Tourist attractions in Pärnu County
Lääneranna Parish